This is a list of Swedish television related events from 2005.

Events
30 January - Kanal5 joined forces with TVN from Norway to co-produce the Scandinavian version of Big Brother.
24 April - Sandra Oxenryd wins the fourth and final season of Fame Factory, becoming the show's first and only woman to have won.
22 May - The first season of the Scandinavian version of Big Brother is won by Britt Goodwin from Norway.
2 December - Agnes Carlsson wins the second season of Idol.

Debuts
30 January - The Scandinavian version of Big Brother (2005-2006, 2014–present)

Television shows
1–24 December - En Decemberdröm

2000s
Idol (2004-2011, 2013–present)

Ending this year

Fame Factory (2002-2005)

Births

Deaths

See also
2005 in Sweden

References